Luís Carlos Machado Mata (born 6 July 1997) is a Portuguese professional footballer who plays as a left-back for Polish club Zagłębie Lubin.

Club career

Porto B
Born in Porto, Mata came through the ranks of hometown club FC Porto. On 7 August 2016, he made his professional debut with FC Porto B in a 2016–17 LigaPro match against C.D. Aves, a 2–1 away loss. The following January, he was loaned to Portimonense S.C. of the same league for the rest of the season.

On 27 September 2017, Mata scored his only goal for Porto B to conclude a 2–0 home win over C.D. Cova da Piedade. The following 6 March, he had his one call-up to the first team, remaining unused in a goalless draw away to Liverpool after the Dragons had already lost the first leg of the UEFA Champions League last 16 5–0 at home.

Mata was loaned to FC Cartagena of the Spanish Segunda División B on 31 August 2018, along with clubmates Rui Moreira and João Costa. Under manager Gustavo Munúa, he was fourth choice in his primary position, but made more appearances in the second half of the season at right back due to an injury crisis.

On 5 January 2020, captain Mata was sent off in the 17th minute of Porto B's 3–1 home loss to Académica de Coimbra for giving away a penalty, from which Zé Castro opened the scoring.

Pogoń Szczecin
On 9 July 2020, Mata ended his 13-year stay with Porto with 12 months of contract remaining, to sign a three-year deal at Pogoń Szczecin in the Polish Ekstraklasa. He joined his compatriot former teammate Tomás Podstawski at the club.

Zagłębie Lubin
On 8 February 2023, having lost his spot in the line-up to Léo Borges in the latter half of 2022, and with Leonardo Koutris' arrival in the winter, Mata left Pogoń for another Ekstraklasa team, Zagłębie Lubin, penning a deal until June 2025.

References

External links

1997 births
Footballers from Porto
Living people
Portuguese footballers
Portugal youth international footballers
Portugal under-21 international footballers
Association football defenders
FC Porto B players
Portimonense S.C. players
FC Cartagena footballers
Pogoń Szczecin players
Zagłębie Lubin players
Liga Portugal 2 players
Segunda División B players
Ekstraklasa players
III liga players
Portuguese expatriate footballers
Expatriate footballers in Spain
Expatriate footballers in Poland
Portuguese expatriate sportspeople in Spain
Portuguese expatriate sportspeople in Poland